The Chisholm Formation is a geologic formation in Utah. It preserves fossils dating back to the Cambrian period.

See also

 List of fossiliferous stratigraphic units in Utah
 Paleontology in Utah

References
 

Cambrian geology of Utah
Cambrian southern paleotropical deposits